Madurai Aruvai Vanigan Ilavettanar (Tamil: மதுரை அறுவை வாணிகன் இளவேட்டனார்) was a poet of the Sangam period, to whom 13 verses of the Sangam literature have been attributed, including verse 35 of the Tiruvalluva Maalai. It is his verse in Tiruvalluva Maalai that bestowed the Kural with the name Vaayurai Vaalthu.

Biography
Madurai Aruvai Vanigan Ilavettanar was a textile merchant from the city of Madurai.

Contribution to the Sangam literature
Madurai Aruvai Vanigan Ilavettanar has written 13 verses, including 1 in Kurunthogai, 4 in Natrinai, 6 in Agananuru, 1 in Purananuru, and 1 in Tiruvalluva Maalai.

See also

 Sangam literature
 List of Sangam poets
 Tiruvalluva Maalai

Notes

Tamil philosophy
Tamil poets
Sangam poets
Tiruvalluva Maalai contributors